Greco-Roman wrestling competition began in the Olympics in 1896.  The United States first took part in this competition in 1912. FILA World Championships began in 1904. The United States first took part in this competition in 1961. After 1920, FILA suspended the World Championships during Olympic years.

Olympics and World Championships

1896

1904

1905

1906–1907

1908–1909

1910

1911

1912

1913

1920

1921–1928

1932–1936

1948–1968

1969–1996

1997–2001

2002–2013

2014–2017

2018–

World Cups

Team Titles and Results
The tables shows the team results and titles for World Championships, World Cups, and Olympic Games.

Multiple-time gold medalists
The tables shows those who have won at least 2 gold medals at the World Championships or Olympic Games. Boldface denotes active wrestlers and highest medal count among all wrestlers (including these who not included in these tables) per type.

Notes

See also

USA Wrestling
Wrestling in the United States
United States results in men's freestyle wrestling
United States results in women's freestyle wrestling
List of World and Olympic Champions in Greco-Roman wrestling

References
 FILA Database
USA Wrestling Olympic Team History
USA Wrestling World Team History

United States Greco-Roman Mens
Greco
Greco-Roman wrestling